Joseph   Akahan (12 April 1937 – May 1968) was Chief of Army Staff (Nigeria) from May 1967 until May 1968, when he was killed in a helicopter crash during the Nigerian Civil War.

Birth and education

Akahan was born on 12 April 1937 in Gboko Local Government Area of Benue State. 
He attended Government College Keffi where he obtained his Cambridge School Certificate (1952–1956). 
He trained as an officer cadet at the RWAFF Training School Teshi, Ghana (1957–1958) and the Royal Military Academy Sandhurst, United Kingdom (1958–1960). He was commissed on 23 July 1960.

Military career
Akahan served with the Nigerian Contingent during the United Nations Peacekeeping Operations in Congo.
In the January 1966 coup that brought Major General Johnson Aguiyi-Ironsi to power, the mainly northern Ibadan-based 4th battalion lost its commanding officer who was replaced by an Igbo, Major Nzefili. The northern officers refused to obey him, and Aguiyi-Ironsi was forced to replace him with Major Joe Akahan, a northern Tiv officer.
Akahan was one of the leaders of the Nigerian counter-coup of 1966 in which Aguiyi-Ironsi was killed and replaced General Yakubu Gowon, and in which there was a mass slaughter of Igbo officers at 4th Battalion in Ibadan under Akahan's command.
Following the coup he said there would be no more killing by Northern soldiers "since events had now balanced out".

Akahan was appointed Chief of Army Staff in May 1967 shortly before the outbreak of the Nigerian Civil War.
He was said to be the brain behind the concept of the sea-borne operations led by Lt. Colonel Benjamin Adekunle that captured Bonny in July 1967.
When he died in a helicopter crash in May 1968, he was replaced as COAS by General Hassan Katsina.
Joe Akahan Barracks is named after him, located in Makurdi, capital of his home state (Benue) and an early base of operations during the civil war.

References

1937 births
1968 deaths
People from Gboko
Nigerian Army officers
Participants in the 1966 Nigerian counter-coup
Graduates of the Royal Military Academy Sandhurst
Military personnel killed in the Nigerian Civil War
Chiefs of Army Staff (Nigeria)